Royal Fleet Auxiliary ship Maine (formerly the SS Panama) was a hospital ship of the British Royal Fleet Auxiliary, that served during the First World War and the Second World War.

Civilian service
The ship was originally launched as SS Panama on Clydeside on 8 March 1902, as an ocean liner for the Pacific Steam Navigation Company of Liverpool. Her maiden voyage carried 130 first-class passengers from Liverpool to Montevideo and Valparaiso. Thereafter, she was generally engaged in a triangular route between Liverpool, Lisbon, Portugal, Vigo, Spain and various ports in South America. The ,  ship was registered in Liverpool assigned the United Kingdom official number 115276, signal letters TJKP.

First World War
After the start of the First World War, on 25 July 1915, Panama was chartered by the British Admiralty for use as a hospital ship, without a change of name. Following conversion, she was dispatched to the Mediterranean to evacuate casualties from the Gallipoli campaign, but from the summer of 1916, she was mainly engaged in ferrying the sick and wounded from Le Havre to Netley Hospital at Southampton. In December 1916, Panama was sent to Greece to assist with the Macedonian front, but had returned to home waters by the following February.

Inter-war period
Panama was purchased outright by the Admiralty shortly afterwards for use as a hospital ship with the Mediterranean Fleet. Renamed Maine, she was the third, and longest serving hospital ship to bear the name, the first which was donated by the "American Ladies Hospital Ship Society" for use in the Second Boer War had been wrecked in July 1914 and replaced by the second.

She entered service after conversion in May 1922 and was sent to Malta and in September, evacuated Greek refugees from the Burning of Smyrna. In January 1927, she left Malta for Singapore for deployment to the China Station, returning to Portsmouth in December before rejoining the Mediterranean Fleet. On 20 February 1928 Maine broke her moorings during a storm at Malta and was grounded. In 1935 she attended King George V's Silver Jubilee Fleet Review off Spithead, where she was used to entertain important guests, her Red Cross markings having been removed for the occasion. Between July 1936 and July 1938, she participated in the evacuation of refugees from the Spanish Civil War, carrying a total of 6,574 refugees of 41 nationalities to safety.

Second World War
During the war, Maine acted as Base Hospital Ship at Alexandria in Egypt and treated a total of 13,514 patients, despite being damaged during air raids on the port. She also participated in the evacuation of Crete, the Siege of Tobruk and the Allied invasion of Sicily. She was the oldest hospital ship from any nation during the conflict. Following the end of the war, she assisted casualties from the Greek Civil War and the Corfu Channel incident. Maine was decommissioned on 21 February 1947, and was broken up by P & W McClellan  & Sons in Bo'ness, Scotland, in July 1948.

Footnotes

References

External links
 Photos of Maine

Hospital ships of the United Kingdom
Ships of the Royal Fleet Auxiliary
1902 ships
Ships built on the River Clyde
Steamships of the United Kingdom
Passenger ships of the United Kingdom
World War I merchant ships of the United Kingdom